Al-Fara'i is a sub-district located in Hubaysh District, Ibb Governorate, Yemen. Al-Fara'i had a population of 2465 according to the 2004 census.

References 

Sub-districts in Hubaysh District